The Tapoco Lodge Historic District encompasses a historic mountain lodge and resort in Robbinsville, North Carolina.  The lodge was developed in the 1930s by Tapoco, formerly the Tallassee Power Company, which developed hydroelectric power projects in the area.  The lodge and associated cabins were built to provide housing for Tapoco employees working in the area.  The main lodge, a 2-1/2 story Colonial Revival structure, was built in 1930, and the facilities were gradually enlarged during the next decade to include a number of guest cabins.  Around 1950 a theater, guard house, and other utility buildings were added to the complex.  Gazebos and tennis courts were added in the late 1990s.

The property was listed on the National Register of Historic Places in 2004.

See also
National Register of Historic Places listings in Graham County, North Carolina

References

Hotel buildings on the National Register of Historic Places in North Carolina
Colonial Revival architecture in North Carolina
Historic districts on the National Register of Historic Places in North Carolina
Buildings and structures in Graham County, North Carolina
National Register of Historic Places in Graham County, North Carolina